John Townsend (1737 – 4 August 1810) was an Irish politician.

He was the third son of Richard Townsend, son of Bryan Townsend, and his second wife Elizabeth Beecher, daughter of Henry Beecher and granddaughter of Thomas Beecher. In 1783, Townsend entered the Irish House of Commons for Dingle, the same constituency his brother Richard Townsend had also represented, and sat for it until 1797. In the following year he was elected for Doneraile and Castlemartyr (Parliament of Ireland constituency), representing the latter until the Act of Union in 1801.

In 1769, he married Mary Morris, daughter of Jonas Morris. They had four daughters and four sons.

References

1737 births
1810 deaths
Irish MPs 1783–1790
Irish MPs 1790–1797
Irish MPs 1798–1800
Members of the Parliament of Ireland (pre-1801) for County Kerry constituencies
Members of the Parliament of Ireland (pre-1801) for County Cork constituencies